The Hemigalinae are a subfamily of the viverrids denominated and first described by John Edward Gray in 1864.
Hemigalinae species are native to Southeast Asia from southern China through Indochina, Malay Peninsula to Sumatra, Borneo and Sulawesi.

Characteristics
The tails of Hemigalinae species are ringed. The toes and the middle of the lower part of the tarsus are bald. The frenum, upper part, and sides of the lower part are hairy. The orbit is imperfect.

Hemigalinae resemble the Viverrinae in having the scent glands present in both sexes and wholly perineal, but differing by their simpler structure, consisting in the male of a shallower, 
smaller pouch, with less tumid lips, situated midway between the scrotum and the penis, but not extending to either. In the female, the scent glands consist of a pair of swellings, each with a slit-like orifice, situated one on each side of the vulva and a little behind it and on a common eminence, the perineal area behind this eminence being naked. The prepuce is long and pendulous. The feet are nearly intermediate in structure between those of the digitigrade Viverrinae and the semiplantigrade Paradoxurinae, but more like the latter, both the carpal and metatarsal pads being well developed, double, and joining the plantar pad below, and as wide as it is at the point of contact. But the feet, with the pads, are considerably narrower, the carpals and metatarsals converging and meeting above so that a much larger area of the under surface is hairy. The area between the four main digits and the plantar pad is covered with short hair, and the pads of the third and fourth digits of the hind foot are separated as in the Viverrinae, not confluent as in the Paradoxurinae. The retractile claws are not protected by skin-lobes.

Classification 
The Hemigalinae subfamily comprises the following five monospecific genera:

References

External links 

Viverrids
Mammals of Asia
Taxa named by John Edward Gray
Mammal subfamilies